Kamil Pasha al-Qudsi  ; (1845– 1926) was a Syrian statesman who served as the first Governor General of the State of Aleppo between 1920 and 1922.

References 

Arabs from the Ottoman Empire
Syrian politicians
Political people from the Ottoman Empire
Pashas
Syrian Muslims
People from Aleppo
Al-Qudsi family
Governor General of the State of Aleppo